Agama hispida, also known commonly as the common spiny agama, the southern spiny agama, and the spiny ground agama, is a species of lizard in the family Agamidae. The species is native to southern Africa. There are two recognized subspecies.

Geographic range
A. hispida is found in Botswana, Namibia, and South Africa.

Habitat
The preferred natural habitat of A. hispida is shrubland.

Description
A. hispida is a small lizard.

Reproduction
A. hispida is oviparous.

Subspecies
Two subspecies are recognized as being valid, including the nominotypical subspecies.
Agama hispida hispida 
Agama hispida makarikarika 

Nota bene: A trinomial authority in parentheses indicates that the subspecies was originally described in a genus other than Agama.

References

Further reading
FitzSimons V (1932). "Preliminary Descriptions of New Forms of South African Reptilia and Amphibia, from the Vernay-Lang Kalahari Expedition, 1930". Annals of the Transvaal Museum 15 (1): 35–40. ("Agama hispida makarikarica [sic]", new subspecies, p. 36).
Linnaeus C (1758). Systema naturæ per regna tria naturæ, secundum classes, ordines, genera, species, cum characteribus, differentiis, synonymis, locis. Tomus I. Editio Decima, Reformata. Stockholm: L. Salvius. 824 pp. (Lacerta hispida, new species, pp. 205–206). (in Latin).

Agama (genus)
Reptiles described in 1827
Taxa named by Johann Jakob Kaup